Jon Santiago (born April 1, 1982) is an American physician and Democratic politician who served in the Massachusetts state representative for the 9th Suffolk district from 2019 to March 2023. He ran a campaign for mayor of Boston in 2021, but withdrew from the race before the primary election.

Santiago resigned from the legislature on March 1, 2023, after becoming Massachusetts' Secretary of the Executive Office of Veterans' Services.

Early life
Santiago was raised in Boston and is of Puerto Rican descent.

Since 2013, Santiago is a captain in the United States Army Reserve. He previously served as a volunteer community health specialist to the Peace Corps. Santiago graduated from Yale School of Medicine. He is a member of the Massachusetts Black and Latino Legislative Caucus.

State representative
Santiago has served as the Massachusetts state representative for the 9th Suffolk district since 2019. His district mostly comprises the South End neighborhood of Boston, though it also includes parts of Boston's Roxbury, Back Bay and Fenway neighborhoods. His 2018 victory in the Democratic primary unseated the chamber's assistant majority leader Byron Rushing, who had represented the district for 35 years, starting in 1983. Santiago had been a State House intern for Rushing before challenging him to his seat.

Santiago continues to serve as an attending physician in emergency medicine for the Boston Medical Center, arguing that such a job informs his legislation, especially when it comes to matters of public health like the opioid epidemic.

Santiago resigned from the legislature on March 1, 2023, after being appointed by governor Maura Healey to become Massachusetts' Secretary of the Executive Office of Veterans' Services.

2021 mayoral campaign
On February 23, 2021, he announced his candidacy for the 2021 Boston mayoral election.

He withdrew from the race on July 13, 2021, and later endorsed Acting Mayor Kim Janey ahead of the preliminary election.<ref name="Janeyendorse1"/ Because he ended his campaign after the withdrawal deadline, he was still listed on the ballot.

See also
 2019–2020 Massachusetts legislature
 2021–2022 Massachusetts legislature

References

Living people
Democratic Party members of the Massachusetts House of Representatives
People from Mayagüez, Puerto Rico
Year of birth missing (living people)
American politicians of Puerto Rican descent
Hispanic and Latino American state legislators in Massachusetts
21st-century American politicians
Politicians from Boston
Candidates in the 2021 United States elections
People from South End, Boston
United States Army reservists
Yale School of Medicine alumni
1980s births